Intestinal varices are dilated submucosal veins in the intestine.One treatment includes a transjugular intrahepatic portosystemic shunt.

References

Gastrointestinal tract disorders